Islam in the Cocos (Keeling) Islands is the majority religion.

The large Muslim population is due to the migration of labourers who were brought to Cocos (Keeling) Islands and to Christmas Island of ethnic Malay and Indonesian origin. The population on the two inhabited Cocos (Keeling) Islands generally is split between the ethnic Europeans on West Island (est. pop. 120) and the ethnic Malays on Home Island (est. pop. 500).

The Island's main Muslim organisation is the Islamic Council of Cocos Keeling Islands.

The Islands have three mosques, the most recent of which is the heritage-listed West Island Mosque.

See also
Islam in Australia

References

External links
  Persatuan Islam Pulu Cocos